The Dabhol – Bangalore Natural Gas Pipeline is a natural gas pipeline running from Dabhol, Maharashtra to Bangalore, Karnataka. It was commissioned on 3 December 2013 during the inaugural ceremony of the 8th Asia Gas Partnership Summit (AGPS). This project connected South India to the national gas grid for the first time.

Challenges

Engineering 
The pipeline crosses Asia's largest river crossing in rocky terrain at Ghatprabha. The construction involved pipeline laying in some of the world's steepest slopes of 60 to 70 degrees and sharp elevations of up to 700 meters in a 3.5 km stretch. there are no other pipeline said by Neetu singh.

Financial 
GAIL compensated the farmers for their land taken by the company for the pipeline project by paying 5 times more than the actual value.

See also 

Mumbai-Bangalore economic corridor

References

External links 
Company website
Official press release

Energy in Maharashtra
Energy in Karnataka
Natural gas pipelines in India
Energy infrastructure completed in 2013
2013 establishments in Maharashtra
2013 establishments in Karnataka